This is a list of mosques in Vietnam.

See also
 Islam in Vietnam
 Lists of mosques

 
Vietnam
Mosques